Joel Corry (born 10 June 1989) is an English DJ, producer and television personality. He came to prominence in 2019 with the release of his single "Sorry", featuring vocals from Hayley May (who was not credited in the official music video), which reached number six in the UK Singles Chart. In 2020, Corry released the singles "Lonely" and "Head & Heart". The latter, which features MNEK on vocals, spent six weeks at number one in the UK Top Singles Chart and also became Corry's first entry on the US Billboard Hot 100. Corry stated that he was influenced by UK garage growing up, and that it played a "huge role in his development as a DJ and a producer".

Career
Corry had a reccurring role on MTV reality television series Geordie Shore, alongside then-girlfriend Sophie Kasaei from 2012-2013, he briefly appeared again on the show in 2017. He also has a personal training business, an app called Joel Corry PT and a gym and leisurewear company Most Rated, which is also the name of his own record label. In 2015 he released his debut singles "Back Again" and "Light It Up". In 2017 he released the singles "Just Wanna", "All the Things", "All Night", "Sunlight" and "Feel This Way". He released the singles "Hurt", "All I Need", "Only You", "Good As Gold" and "Fallen" in 2018 which premiered on Our Culture Mag. In April 2019, he released the single "Sorry"; the song features uncredited vocals from Hayley May. In July 2019, the song broke the record for the most Shazamed track in one day, with 41,000 Shazams. The song was featured on the ITV2 reality television series Love Island. The song peaked at number six on the UK Singles Chart.

In July 2020, Corry achieved his first UK number-one single with the MNEK collaboration "Head & Heart". It stayed at number 1 for six consecutive weeks and became an international hit for Corry. It was certified platinum for exceeding 600,000 units on 11 September 2020.

In July 2022, Corry appeared in an episode of Love Island where he DJed for a party thrown for the islanders.

On 21 October 2022, Corry released "Lionheart (Fearless)" which features singer Tom Grennan. The single debuted at number 37 on the UK singles chart, peaking in its twelfth week on the chart at number 18.

Discography

Extended plays

Singles

Promotional singles

Remixes

Awards and nominations

Notes

References 

1989 births
Living people
APRA Award winners
DJs from London
English record producers
English house musicians
Asylum Records artists
Ableton Live users
Remixers
Electronic dance music DJs